Mohamed Camara (born 24 August 1982) is a Guinean former footballer. He spent one season with Algerian side Biskra before moving to Moldova to sign for Tiligul Tiraspol.

Career statistics

Club

Notes

References

1982 births
Living people
Guinean footballers
Association football midfielders
Algerian Ligue Professionnelle 1 players
AS Kaloum Star players
US Biskra players
CS Tiligul-Tiras Tiraspol players
Guinean expatriate footballers
Expatriate footballers in Algeria
Guinean expatriate sportspeople in Moldova
Expatriate footballers in Moldova